Muriel Landers (October 27, 1921 – February 19, 1977) was an American actress, singer and dancer. She made more than thirty film and television appearances between 1950 and 1971.

Career
Born in Chicago, Landers began her career as a concert singer before moving to New York City to pursue acting. In 1951, Landers appeared on the variety series The Frank Sinatra Show. Her performance on the series caught the attention of Jack Benny who invited her to perform with him at the London Palladium. Landers later appeared with Benny in two episodes of The Jack Benny Program in 1956 and 1958.

She also performed on Where's Raymond?, starring Ray Bolger, The Jimmy Durante Show, The Red Skelton Show and Cavalcade of Stars, hosted by Jackie Gleason. In 1952, Landers made her feature film debut in the comedy Bela Lugosi Meets a Brooklyn Gorilla, starring Duke Mitchell and Sammy Petrillo. That same year, she won a regular role on the sitcom Life with Luigi. The series was canceled in 1953.

In 1957 she was signed by producer Jules White to co-star in a new series of short-subject comedies for Columbia Pictures. This was a bold move, because most studios had discontinued shorts and White was the only man still making them. The pilot film for the new "Girlie Whirls" series, Tricky Chicks, cast Muriel Landers and Bek Nelson as chubby and slender showgirls. The series was abandoned after the one film. In 1958, she appeared in the Three Stooges short Sweet and Hot. In the film, she portrayed Joe Besser's sister "Tiny", who is a singer with stage fright. She performs the song "The Heat Is On" (in footage taken from Tricky Chicks). The next year, Landers had a supporting role in the romantic comedy Pillow Talk, starring Rock Hudson and Doris Day.

Landers continued to play funny fat girls in television shows. She appeared in an episode of "Make Room for Daddy" starring Danny Thomas on May 18, 1959 entitled "The Practical Joke" as a chubby maid who wants to make it in show business. In 1960 and 1961, she appeared in two episodes of Pete and Gladys as Gladys' cousin Violet. She also had a recurring role as "Mildred Cosgrove" on The Joey Bishop Show. In addition to her comedic roles, Landers also guest starred on several dramas and Westerns including The Gene Autry Show, Peter Gunn, The Dick Powell Show and The Eleventh Hour. In 1962, Landers made a memorable appearance in The Twilight Zone episode "A Piano in the House", playing Marge Moore, an overweight woman who is forced to reveal her inner sadness about feeling unloved and unwanted because of her girth. In 1963, she and actor Stanley Adams released the comedy record Marriage Is for Dinosaurs through Bigtop Records. The next year, she had a role in the comedy film The Disorderly Orderly. For the remainder of the decade, Landers continued with guest starring roles on The Beverly Hillbillies, My Three Sons and Hogan's Heroes. In 1967, she portrayed the role of Mrs. Blossom in Doctor Dolittle. It would be her last film role.

In December 1968, she joined the cast of Rowan and Martin's Laugh-In and appeared in a few episodes. One of Landers' last roles was as Mommy Hoo Doo in an episode of the children's television series Lidsville, in 1971. Her final onscreen role was in the 1974 television film Remember When.

Death
Landers suffered from hypertension and diabetes in the final years of her life. She died of a stroke on February 19, 1977, and is interred at Forest Lawn Memorial Park, Hollywood Hills.

Filmography

References

External links

1921 births
1977 deaths
20th-century American actresses
Actresses from Chicago
American female dancers
American film actresses
American television actresses
American stage actresses
Burials at Forest Lawn Memorial Park (Hollywood Hills)
20th-century American singers
20th-century American women singers
20th-century American dancers